John Poyner (born October 1933) is a sound editor.

He won the Academy Award for Best Sound Editing at the 1967 Academy Awards for The Dirty Dozen.

He has over 60 credits since his start in 1955.

Selected filmography

The Saint (1997)
Thelma & Louise (1991)
Death Wish 3 (1985)
Never Say Never Again (1983)
An American Werewolf in London (1981)
Phase IV (1974)
Goodbye, Mr. Chips (1969)
The Dirty Dozen (1967)

References

External links

Best Sound Editing Academy Award winners
British sound editors
Living people
1933 births